Cicely Madden (born March 28, 1995) is an American rower. She competed in the women's quadruple sculls event at the 2020 Summer Olympics.

References

External links
 
 Cicely Madden at the United States Olympic & Paralympic Committee

1995 births
Living people
American female rowers
Olympic rowers of the United States
Rowers at the 2020 Summer Olympics
Place of birth missing (living people)
21st-century American women